A Patriotism Curriculum or Desh/Rashtra Bhakti Curriculum is an Indian educational program for children studying in nursery to grade twelve in schools run by the Government of Delhi since 28 September 2021.

Thought exercises 
Questions the students will face include:

See also 

 Happiness Curriculum

References 

Education in Delhi
Curricula
Patriotism